Counties 2 Durham & Northumberland, formerly known as Durham/Northumberland 2, is an English rugby union league at the eighth tier of the domestic competition for teams from North East England. The champions and runner-up are promoted to Counties 1 Durham & Northumberland and the bottom two clubs are relegated to Counties 3 Durham & Northumberland.  Each season two teams from Durham/Northumberland 2 are picked to take part in the RFU Senior Vase (a national competition for clubs at level 8) - one affiliated with the Durham County RFU, the other with the Northumberland RFU.  Ponteland won their fourth title in 2020 with Sunderland also promoted.

Participating clubs 2022–23
Ashington
Barnard Castle
Bishop Auckland
Gateshead
North Shields
Redcar
Ryton
Seaham
Sedgefield
Wallsend (promoted from Durham / Northumberland 3 North)
Whitby
Winlaton Vulcans

Participating clubs 2021–22

The teams competing in 2021-22 achieved their places in the league based on performances in 2019-20, the 'previous season' column in the table below refers to that season not 2020-21.

Season 2020–21

On 30 October 2020 the RFU announced  that due to the coronavirus pandemic a decision had been taken to cancel Adult Competitive Leagues (National League 1 and below) for the 2020/21 season meaning DN2 was not contested.

Participating clubs 2019-20

Original teams
When league rugby began in 1987 this division contained the following teams:

Bishop Auckland
Consett
Hartlepool
Hartlepool B.B.O.B.
Houghton
North Durham
Medicals
Mowden Park
Seaham
Sunderland
Wallsend

Durham/Northumberland 2 honours

Durham/Northumberland 2 (1987–1993)

The original Durham/Northumberland 2 was a tier 10 league with promotion up to Durham/Northumberland 1 and relegation down to Durham/Northumberland 3.

Durham/Northumberland 2 (1993–2000)

The creation of National 5 North for the 1993–94 season meant that Durham/Northumberland 2 dropped to being a tier 11 league.  A further restructure at the end of the 1995–96 season saw Durham/Northumberland 2 remain at tier 11.

Durham/Northumberland 2 (2000–present)

Northern league restructuring by the RFU at the end of the 1999–2000 season saw the cancellation of North East 1, North East 2 and North East 3 (tiers 7–9).  This meant that Durham/Northumberland 2 became a tier 8 league.

Number of league titles

Ponteland (4)
Consett (3)
Acklam (2)
Bishop Auckland (2)
Gosforth (2)
Ryton (2)
Ashington (1)
Barnard Castle (1)
Billingham (1)
Blyth (1)
Gateshead (1)
Guisborough (1)
Hartlepool (1)
Houghton (1)
Mowden Park (1)
North Durham  (1)
Percy Park (1)
Redcar (1)
Sunderland (1)
Team Northumbria (1)
Wallsend (1)
Winlaton Vulcans (1)
Whitley Bay Rockcliff (1)
Whitby (1)

Notes

See also
 Durham RFU
 Northumberland RFU
 English rugby union system
 Rugby union in England

References

8
Rugby union in Northumberland
Rugby union in County Durham